Feasting on Blood is the debut album by the brutal death metal band Severe Torture, released by Hammerheart Records on October 9, 2000.

A digipack version of this album was also released which included two bonus tracks from the Lambs of a God 7 inch EP and a CD-ROM video.

Track listing 
Feces for Jesus - 03:15
Blood - 02:53
Decomposing Bitch - 04:49
Baptized in Virginal Liquid - 02:37
Twist the Cross - 03:26
Butchery of the Soul - 03:42
Rest in Flames - 03:01
Severe Torture - 02:05
Pray For Nothing - 03:38
Vomiting Christ - 04:22

Personnel
Dennis Schreurs – vocals 
Thijs van Laarhoven – guitar 
Patrick Boleij – bass 
Seth van de Loo – drums, vocals on "Feces for Jesus"

References

Severe Torture albums
2000 albums
Hammerheart Records albums